Events from the year 1878 in Canada.

Incumbents

Crown 
 Monarch – Victoria

Federal government 
 Governor General – Frederick Hamilton-Temple-Blackwood (until November 25) then John Campbell, Marquess of Lorne 
 Prime Minister – Alexander Mackenzie (until October 8) then John A. Macdonald (from October 17)
 Chief Justice – William Buell Richards (Ontario) 
 Parliament – 3rd (until 17 August)

Provincial governments

Lieutenant governors 
 Lieutenant Governor of British Columbia – Albert Norton Richards
 Lieutenant Governor of Manitoba – Joseph-Édouard Cauchon
 Lieutenant Governor of New Brunswick – Samuel Leonard Tilley (until July 11) then Edward Barron Chandler
 Lieutenant Governor of the North-West Territories – David Laird
 Lieutenant Governor of Nova Scotia – Adams George Archibald
 Lieutenant Governor of Ontario – Donald Alexander Macdonald
 Lieutenant Governor of Prince Edward Island – Robert Hodgson
 Lieutenant Governor of Quebec – Luc Letellier de St-Just

Premiers 
Premier of British Columbia – Andrew Charles Elliott (until June 25) then George Anthony Walkem
Premier of Manitoba – Robert Atkinson Davis (until October 16) then John Norquay 
Premier of New Brunswick – George Edwin King (until May 3) then John James Fraser
Premier of Nova Scotia – Philip Carteret Hill (until October 15) then Simon Hugh Holmes (from October 22)
Premier of Ontario – Oliver Mowat
Premier of Prince Edward Island – Louis Henry Davies 
Premier of Quebec – Charles Boucher de Boucherville (until March 8) then Henri-Gustave Joly de Lotbinière

Territorial governments

Lieutenant governors 
 Lieutenant Governor of Keewatin – Joseph-Édouard Cauchon
 Lieutenant Governor of the North-West Territories – David Laird

Events
March 7 – Both the Université de Montréal and the University of Western Ontario are incorporated
March 8 – Henri-Gustave Joly de Lotbinière becomes premier of Quebec, replacing Sir Charles-Eugène de Boucherville
May 1 – In the Quebec election, Joseph-Adolphe Chapleau's Conservatives win a minority 
June – The New Brunswick election
June 25 – George Walkem becomes premier of British Columbia for the second time, replacing Andrew Elliott
July 20 – The British Columbia election
September 17 
In the federal election, Sir John A. Macdonald's Conservatives win a majority, defeating Alexander Mackenzie's Liberals
In the Nova Scotia election, Simon Hugh Holmes's Conservatives win a majority, defeating Philip Carteret Hill's Liberals
October 16 – John Norquay becomes premier of Manitoba, replacing Robert A. Davis
October 17 – Sir John A. Macdonald becomes prime minister for the second time, replacing Alexander Mackenzie
October 22 – Simon Holmes becomes premier of Nova Scotia, replacing Philip Hill
December 18 – The Manitoba election

Full date unknown
Anti-Chinese sentiment in British Columbia reaches a high point as the government bans Chinese workers from public works.
John James Fraser becomes premier of New Brunswick, replacing George King
The Newfoundland election

Births

January to June
January 11 – Percy Chapman Black, politician (d.1961)
January 13 – Lionel Groulx, priest, historian, Quebec nationalist and traditionalist (d.1967)
January 22 – Ernest Charles Drury, politician, writer and 8th Premier of Ontario (d.1968)
February 27 – William Herbert Burns, politician (d.1964)
February 28 – Arthur Roebuck, politician and labour lawyer (d.1971)
April 14 – John Walter Jones, politician and Premier of Prince Edward Island (d.1954)
April 29 – Fawcett Taylor, politician
June 14 – Lewis Stubbs, judge and politician (d.1958)
June 20 – Seymour Farmer, politician (d.1951)

July to December

July 14 – Ernest Frederick Armstrong, politician (d.1948)
July 23 – James Thomas Milton Anderson, politician and 5th Premier of Saskatchewan (d.1946)
August 15 – Thomas Laird Kennedy, politician and 15th Premier of Ontario (d.1959)
September 18 – William Sherring, marathon runner and Olympic gold medalist (d.1964)
December 8 – Henry Herbert Stevens, politician and businessman (d.1973)
December 30 – William Aberhart, politician and 8th Premier of Alberta (d.1943)

Deaths
February 23 – William Workman, businessman and municipal politician (b.1807)
April 3 – Louis-Philippe Turcotte, historian (b.1842)
April 12 – John Young, politician (b.1811)
May 13 – George Moffat, Sr., businessman and politician (b.1810)
May 20 – Lemuel Allan Wilmot, lawyer, politician, judge, and  3rd Lieutenant Governor of New Brunswick (b.1809)
November 3 – Pierre Bachand, politician (b.1835)
November 28 – Francis Evans Cornish, politician (b.1831)
December 6 – Jean-Baptiste Meilleur, doctor, educator and politician (b.1796)

Historical documents
J.A. Macdonald's speech about the dismissal of Quebec's government by its lieutenant-governor

Hudson's Bay Company policy change causes Indigenous people to starve in the Sept-Îles, Que. area

Editorial foresees great immigration as Winnipeg inaugurates regular train service

Arrivals in Manitoba find the good land is "taken" and freight and other costs are exorbitant

First apples and pears arrive in Battleford, causing homesickness

References
  

 
Years of the 19th century in Canada
Canada
1878 in North America